Michał Piecha (born 31 March 1979) is a Polish biathlete. He competed in the men's sprint event at the 2006 Winter Olympics.

References

1979 births
Living people
Polish male biathletes
Olympic biathletes of Poland
Biathletes at the 2006 Winter Olympics
People from Rybnik